Preston Martin (December 5, 1923  –  May 30, 2007) was an American economist and banker who served as the 12th vice chairman of the Federal Reserve from 1982 to 1986.

Education
Preston Martin graduated from the University of Southern California in 1947, before completed an MBA in finance from the same university in 1948 and earned his  PhD in monetary economics from Indiana University in 1952.

Career
He was the head of the Economic Department at USC, founded ERG Economic Research Group doing work for Lockheed, among others, while simultaneously writing a book on Housing and Urban Development, as well as serving on the board of directors at Lincoln Savings and Loan.  He then served as California's Saving and Loan Commissioner between 1967 and 1969 under then Governor Ronald Reagan. His exemplary performance at the state level led to President Nixon appointing him as chairman and chief operating officer of the Federal Home Loan Bank Board in 1969. He was involved in creating Freddie Mac while working in this position.  Here also he initiated the 5% mortgage loan bill which was passed, almost as a token because the opposition did not think it would work. There was no entity to insure those loans. Shortly thereafter, when he left the government in 1972, he founded PMI Mortgage Insurance Company to do just that, insure the 5% mortgage loans which would enable thousands of Americans to purchase their first homes.

Martin later established Seraco Enterprises, a subsidiary of Sears, Roebuck and Company based in the Sears Tower in Chicago, and was appointed to the board of directors of Sears. When Sears merged with Coldwell Banker, in 1982, President Reagan appointed him as vice chairman of the Federal Reserve for four years and as a member for 14 years. During his years at the Fed,  Martin was known as a Reagan loyalist who challenged Chairman Paul Volcker's tough anti-inflation policies.

Martin was considered as a possible successor to Paul Volcker as chairman of the Federal Reserve, but Alan Greenspan was appointed instead. Martin returned to San Francisco and created Western Holdings, acquiring failing savings & loans all around the Pacific rim.  He died of cancer, aged 83, in San Francisco, survived by his son Pier Preston Martin, also a banker.

References

External links
Statements and Speeches of Preston Martin

1923 births
2007 deaths
American bankers
Businesspeople from San Francisco
Deaths from cancer in California
Marshall School of Business alumni
Vice Chairs of the Federal Reserve
Reagan administration personnel
Indiana University alumni